Sebastian Pallithode is a prolific Malayalam writer and novelist from Alappuzha, Kerala, India who had received many awards and recognitions for his work. He has written more than 32 novels, including Nirangalude Rajakumaran, Agnus Dei, Judatheruvu, Jeevichirikkunavarude Manasil, Thorathe Peyyunna Mazhayil, Theophinachan: Oru Manushyasnehiyude Velipadukal, Pope John Paul II and Jeevithavum Kaalavum.

In April 2014, he received the first Ponjikkara Rafi literary award for his short stories in several Malayalam magazines and dailies.

Bibliography
Sebastian Pallithode has authored over 32 novels and short stories among them the most notables are

Clint - Nirangalude Rajakumaran
Agnus Dei
Judatheruvu
Jeevichirikkunavarude Manasil
Thorathe Peyyunna Mazhayil
Theophinachan: Oru Manushyasnehiyude Velipadukal
Pope John Paul II
Jeevithavum Kaalavum

References

External links
Official website
Thehindu.com

Male novelists
Living people
Year of birth missing (living people)
Place of birth missing (living people)
Nationality missing